The Beguines is a 1972 French-Italian film directed by Guy Casaril and starring Anicée Alvina and Nicole Courcel. It is based on a 1951 novel by Belgian author Françoise Mallet-Joris. The film was released in September 20, 1972. The literary publication was Mallet-Jorris' debut in her publishing works, and the plot centers around a stage that is reminiscent of her native hometown of Antwerp and addresses the themes of social class and korephilia.

Plot
Helena (Alvina), a 15 year old schoolgirl who lives with her wealthy father Max (Venantino Venantini) and misses her dead mother. Helena is later seduced by her father's former mistress Tamara (Courcel), who takes advantage of the young teen's loneliness through manipulation and simultaneously enters an engagement with Max.

Cast
Anicée Alvina as Helena, the 15 year old schoolgirl
Nicole Courcel as Tamara, the korephilic stepmother

References

External links

Encyclopedic file

1972 films
French drama films
Italian drama films
Films set in France
1970s French-language films
1970s French films
1970s Italian films
French-language Italian films